The Pico de Tenerife is 1,253 meters, the second highest altitude of the island of El Hierro, Canary Islands, Spain, after the Pico de Malpaso with 1,501 meters in height.

See also 
 El Hierro

References 

El Hierro
Mountains of the Canary Islands